Slain By Urusei Yatsura is an album by Scottish indie rock band Urusei Yatsura, released in 1998. It contains the band's only Top 40 hit, "Hello Tiger".

Track listing

"Glo Starz" - 3:32
"Hello Tiger" - 3:17
"Strategic Hamlets" - 2:38
"No 1 Cheesecake" - 2:44
"Superfi" - 3:44
"No No Girl" - 4:58
"Flaming Skull" - 3:31
"Slain By Elf" - 3:36
"King Of Lazy" - 3:06
"Exidor" - 2:58
"Fake Fur" - 3:02
"Skull In Action" - 3:13
"Amber" - 2:53

References

1998 albums
Urusei Yatsura (band) albums